Pigment Cell & Melanoma Research is a peer-reviewed scientific journal of dermatology. It is the official journal of the International Federation of Pigment Cell Societies (IFPCS) and the Society for Melanoma Research (SMR). In 2014, it ranked the 3rd most cited journal of dermatology, out of 62.

Indexing
Pigment Cell & Melanoma Research is indexed in:

External links
International Federation of Pigment Cell Societies website
Society for Melanoma Research website

Publications established in 1987
English-language journals
Oncology journals
Bimonthly journals